William Hunter (16 August 1900 – after 1929) was a Scottish professional footballer who played as a centre half or left back.

Born in Cardenden, Fife, Hunter began his football career with local club Bowhill Juniors before turning professional with Birmingham in 1921. He never established himself as a first-team player with the club, but was a mainstay of the reserve team and performed solidly when given a game in the First Division. He joined Grimsby Town in early 1927, spending only a few months with the club and making just six appearances before returning to the Midlands to sign for Coventry City. The following year he moved to Walsall, and in late 1929 moved on again, this time to Torquay United, before retiring at the end of the 1929–30 season.

He was nicknamed "Sailor", because of his service in the Royal Navy in the First World War.

References

1900 births
Year of death missing
People from Cardenden
Footballers from Fife
Scottish footballers
Association football defenders
Birmingham City F.C. players
Grimsby Town F.C. players
Coventry City F.C. players
Walsall F.C. players
Torquay United F.C. players
English Football League players
Royal Navy personnel of World War I
Place of death missing
Bowhill Rovers F.C. players
Scottish Junior Football Association players